Dafniya (Dafiniya, Al Davniya, Ad Dafinīyah) is a Mediterranean coastal town in Libya, halfway between Misrata and Zliten. During the Libyan Civil War the town of Dafniya saw heavy fighting.

References

Populated places in Misrata District